Christopher Weber (born 5 October 1991) is a German bobsledder. He competed in the two-man event at the 2018 Winter Olympics.

References

External links

Christopher Weber at the German Bobsleigh, Luge, and Skeleton Federation 

1991 births
Living people
German male bobsledders
Bobsledders at the 2018 Winter Olympics
Bobsledders at the 2022 Winter Olympics
Olympic bobsledders of Germany
Sportspeople from Dortmund
Olympic medalists in bobsleigh
Olympic silver medalists for Germany
Medalists at the 2022 Winter Olympics
20th-century German people
21st-century German people